Densen Audio Technologies is a Danish manufacturer of high fidelity equipment based in Esbjerg, a city on the west coast of Jutland, the main peninsula of Denmark.

The original owner sold the company to two buyers in 2021.

References

External links
 Official website

Audio amplifier manufacturers
Compact Disc player manufacturers
Audio equipment manufacturers of Denmark
Esbjerg